is a national highway of Japan connecting the capital of Aomori Prefecture, Aomori to Ōdate in northeastern Akita Prefecture. It has a total length of 130.0 km (80.8 mi).

Route description

Traveling out of Aomori city
The route's northern terminus is an intersection with Japan National Route 4 in the center of the city of Aomori. From here it begins its journey south through the city. Within the urbanized parts of the city it is known as Kankō Dori (Tourism Road). After passing by the headquarters of Michinoku Bank, the highway crosses over the Aoimori Railway Line. It then travels through a heavily commercialized area of the city before reaching an intersection with the Aomori Belt Highway (National Route 7) and the Aomori Expressway. Route 7 serves as a frontage road to the expressway and as an eventual access point to it at Aomori-chūō Interchange.

Continuing out of the commercial area, the highway passes Aomori Chuo Gakuin University. After passing the institution the road divides with the western route serving as a bypass to the main highway to the east. At this point the highway is known as the Hakkōda Gold Line. After passing through a residential area, the main highway and bypass begin the ascent of the Hakkōda Mountains. The highways merge near Aomori Public University, now known solely as the Hakkōda Gold Line. Continuing its ascent up the mountain, the route meets Aomori Prefecture Route 40, a route that provides access to the nearby memorial of the Hakkōda Mountains incident and then travels southeast to Towada, Aomori. Route 103 winds its way up the mountain where it reaches the Hakkōda Ropeway, a cable car that takes skiers and hikers to the peak of Mount Tamoyachi of the Hakkōda Mountains. After a short descent, the road meets Japan National Route 394 at a signaled intersection. Just a couple of kilometers from here is Sukayu Onsen, the snowiest inhabited place on earth famous for its 1,000 person mixed-use bath. The road continues winding down the mountain in southeasterly path, passing other onsen and resorts along the way. This section of road is closed during the winter, but is reopened in early spring as a "snow corridor" where visitors are allowed to walk. It meets Japan National Route 102 at a junction near the Oirase River. Route 103 begins a concurrency with Route 102 here, traveling to southwest towards Lake Towada, while Route 102's eastbound traffic continues following the river's flow towards the city of Towada.

Lake Towada
The concurrency follows the Oirase River upstream until it reaches Lake Towada. At the shore of the lake, the concurrency ends with Route 102 forming the northeast and northern parts of a road that circles the lake, while Route 103 forms the eastern and southern part of the road. As the road begins to travel along the southern shore of the lake it meets Japan National Route 454 where the routes form a concurrency. Along the southern part of this circular road, Routes 103 and 454 cross into Akita Prefecture. Continuing along the lake's southern shore, the road meets the western end of the concurrency, Route 454 continues toward Route 102 as the remaining portion of the road to circle the lake while Route 103 begins traveling to the southeast.

Akita Prefecture
The road meets Japan National Route 104 and turns to the southwest towards Kazuno, Akita. In Kazuno it passes by the Ōyu Stone Circles a Jōmon period site. It continues into the city of Kazuno. In the city it passes under the Tōhoku Expressway and then crosses over the Yoneshiro River where it has a junction with the expressway. The road again crosses the Yoneshiro River several times as it crosses into Ōdate. In Ōdate the road first meets Japan National Route 285, it later has a junction with the Akita Expressway, shortly after the route again meets National Route 7 at Route 103's southern terminus.

History
National Route 103 was established by the Cabinet of Japan between Towadako, Aomori and Ōdate, Akita in 1953. In 1993, the northern terminus of the highway was moved north from Towada to its current location in Aomori city.

List of major junctions
All junctions listed are at-grade intersections unless noted otherwise.

References
 http://www.mlit.go.jp/road/ir/ir-data/tokei-nen/2015/pdf/d_genkyou26.pdf

103
Roads in Akita Prefecture
Roads in Aomori Prefecture